Linda Harrison is an American slalom canoeist who competed in the 1970s and 1980s.

She won two bronze medals in the K-1 event at the ICF Canoe Slalom World Championships, earning them in 1977 and 1979. She also won a gold (1979) and two bronzes (1977, 1981) in the K-1 team event.

References

American female canoeists
Living people
Year of birth missing (living people)
Medalists at the ICF Canoe Slalom World Championships
21st-century American women